Carl Baermann (24 October 1810 – 23 May 1885) was a clarinetist and composer from Munich, Germany.

Life and career
He was the son of noted clarinet virtuoso Heinrich Baermann and Helene Harlas. As a child he was taught the clarinet and the basset horn by his father. He played occasionally in the Munich court orchestra when he was 14 years old, and was appointed its second clarinetist in 1832. When his father retired in 1834, Carl succeeded his father as principal clarinetist. He held that position until he retired in 1880.

He toured Europe with his father in 1827, 1832 and 1838. In 1833 they premiered Felix Mendelssohn's Konzert Stücke, Opp. 113 & 114, (Concert Pieces) to great acclaim. Carl Baermann's compositions, 88 opus numbers, were popular with clarinet virtuosos.

Baermann developed the Baermann-Ottensteiner key system for the clarinet, which was based on the Müller system. The system was very popular during the late 19th century, partly because of Baermann's Vollständige Clarinett-Schule (Complete School for the Clarinet), one of the leading methods for teaching the clarinet, written between 1864 and 1875.

Compositions 
 Concerto Militaire for clarinet and orchestra, Op. 6
 Fantaisie brillante for clarinet and piano, Op. 7
 Variations brillantes for clarinet and piano, Op. 8
 La nuit étoilée (Starry Night Fantasy) for clarinet and piano, Op. 13
 Duo Concertant for two clarinets and piano, Op. 33
 Conzertstück, for clarinet and piano/orchestra, Op. 44
 Travestie for clarinet and piano, Op. 45
 Conzertstück No. 1 for clarinet and piano/orchestra, Op. 49
 Vollständige Clarinett-Schule (Complete Clarinet Method) Opp. 63 and 64
 Historical and Theoretical, Op. 63
 Preparatory Studies, Op. 63
 Daily Studies, Op. 63
 Short Pieces, Op. 64
 Solos, Op. 64

Carl Baermann (son)
Carl Baermann had a son, also named Carl Baermann (9 July 1839 in Munich – 17 January 1913 in Newton, Massachusetts), a pianist who studied with Franz Lachner and Peter Cornelius in Munich and later became a student and friend of Franz Liszt. He moved to the Boston area in America in 1881 where he became a successful pianist and teacher; Amy Beach, Lee Pattison, Frederick Converse, Dai Buell and George Copeland were among his students. He composed a number of works for piano solo and with orchestra, and a set of etudes, Op. 4.

References

External links
 

Complete Studies for Clarinet, Op. 64 on iTunes (Sabine Grofmeier & Ulugbek Palvanov)

German clarinetists
German male classical composers
German Romantic composers
1810 births
1885 deaths
Pupils of Franz Liszt
19th-century classical composers
19th-century German composers
19th-century German male musicians